Hosta nigrescens is a species  of plants that belong to the family Asparagaceae.

Description
The basal mid-green leaves are simple, ovate and petiolate. The plant produces racemes of about 30 cm with 15-25 funnel-shaped white or light purple flowers. They bloom in August.

Distribution
This species is native to Japan.

References
 Hosta Library
 Biolib
 Hortipedia

nigrescens